Vestre Gravlund is a cemetery in the Frogner borough of Oslo, Norway. It is located next to the Borgen metro station. At , it is the largest cemetery in Norway. It was inaugurated in September 1902 and also contains a crematorium (Vestre krematorium) and chapel (Gravkapellet).

The grave chapel was constructed in granite and clay stone and was designed by architect Alfred Christian Dahl (1857–1940). It was built in 1900 and consecrated in 1902. In the foundation wall, it has stained glass that was designed by artist Oddmund Kristiansen (1920–1997) in 1970.

Notable interments 

 Sven Arntzen (1897–1976), barrister 
 Per Aabel (1902–1999), actor
 Eyvind Alnæs (1872–1932), composer
 Finn Alnaes (1932–1991), novelist 
 Lasse Aasland (1926–2001), politician
 Gunnar Andersen (1890–1968), footballer and ski jumper
 Karsten Andersen (1920–1997), composer
 Johan Anker (1871–1940), sailor
 Kristian Birkeland (1867–1917), physicist and inventor
 André Bjerke (1918–1985), writer and poet
 Trygve Bratteli (1910–1984), prime minister
 Edith Carlmar (1911–2003), actress and director 
 Lalla Carlsen (1889–1967), actress and singer 
 Johan Castberg (1862–1926), politician and jurist 
 Halfdan Christensen (1873–1950), actor and director 
 Sven Elvestad (1884–1934), journalist and author
 Alfred Eriksen (1918–1991), Olympic fencer
 Erling Falk (1887–1940), author and politician
 Kirsten Flagstad (1895–1962), opera singer (unmarked headstone)
 Ragnar Frisch (1895–1973), economist 
 Erland Frisvold (1877–1971), politician and colonel
 Einar Gerhardsen (1897–1987), prime minister
 Gregers Gram (1917–1944), resistance fighter and saboteur 
 Kjell Hallbing (1934–2004), writer
 Gunvor Hofmo (1921–1995), poet and writer
 Leif Juster (1910–1995), comedian
 Franciszek Kawa (1901–1985), Polish cross-country skier 
 Janina Zagrodzka-Kawa (1918–2020), Polish poet
 Casey Kasem (1932–2014), actor, voice actor and radio celebrity (unmarked headstone)
 Otto Richard Kierulf (1825–1897), military officer, politician and sports administrator 
 Ada Kramm (1899–1981), actress
 Martin Linge (1894–1941), actor and army captain
 Gerda Ring (1891–1999), stage actress and producer
 Inger Sitter (1929–2015), painter and art instructor
 Adolf Bredo Stabell (1908–1996), diplomat
 Halvard Storm (1877–1964), 20th century artist/etcher of Norwegian landscapes
 Carl Stoermer (1874–1957), mathematician and geophysicist
 Olav Sundal (1899–1978), Olympic gymnast 
 Gunnar Tolnæs (1879–1940), actor
 Egil Holst Torkildsen (1916–1979), Nazi editor and activist

British Commonwealth Graves

This cemetery is registered by the Commonwealth War Graves Commission as "Oslo Western Civil Cemetery".  Plot 60 contains war graves of 101 British Commonwealth service personnel of World War II. Most were airmen shot down raiding the occupied Oslo Airport at Fornebu. Most of the others were killed in air crashes during Allied landings, 43 lives being lost on Liberation Day alone (10 May 1945).

The Cross of Sacrifice monument was unveiled during November 1949. The presiding officer was by General Otto Ruge, who had commanded the Norwegian Army at the time of the German invasion in April 1940. Opposite to the cross the citizens of Oslo erected a memorial to Commonwealth servicemen who died on Norwegian soil during the liberation of Norway.  
The memorial is in form of a kneeling figure of a mourning naked woman and was unveiled during June 1960 by King Olav V of Norway.

References

External links
Vestre gravlund website

 
1902 establishments in Norway
 
Cemeteries in Norway
Buildings and structures in Oslo
Lutheran cemeteries
Commonwealth War Graves Commission cemeteries in Norway
Cemeteries in Oslo